The Loneliness of the Long Distance Runner is a 1962 British coming-of-age film. The screenplay was written by Alan Sillitoe from his 1959 short story of the same title. The film was directed by Tony Richardson, one of the new young directors emerging from the English Stage Company at the Royal Court.

It tells the story of a rebellious youth (played by Tom Courtenay), sentenced to borstal for burgling a bakery, who gains privileges in the institution through his prowess as a long-distance runner. During his solitary runs, reveries of important events, before his incarceration, lead him to re-evaluate his status as the prize athlete of the Governor (Michael Redgrave), eventually undertaking a rebellious act of personal autonomy and suffering an immediate loss of privileges. The films poster byline reads "you can play it by the rules... or you can play it by ear – WHAT COUNTS IS that you play it right for you...".

The film depicts Great Britain in the late 1950's and early 1960's as elitist, where upper-class people enjoy many privileges while lower-class people suffer a bleak life, and its Borstal system, of delinquent youth detention centres, as a way of keeping working-class people in their 'place'. Alan Sillitoe was one of the angry young men producing media, vaunting or depicting the plight of rebellious youth. The film has characters entrenched in their social context. Class consciousness abounds throughout: the "them" and "us" notions that Richardson stresses reflect the basis of the British society at the time, so that Redgrave's "proper gentleman" of a Governor is in sharp contrast to many of the young, working-class, inmates.

Plot 
The film opens with Colin Smith (Tom Courtenay) running, alone, along a bleak country road somewhere in rural England. In a brief voiceover, Colin tells us that running is the way his family has always coped with the world's troubles, but that in the end, the runner is always alone and cut off from spectators, left to deal with life on his own.

Colin is then shown with a group of other young men, all handcuffed. They are being taken to Ruxton Towers, a detention centre for juvenile offenders, a borstal. It is overseen by the Governor (Michael Redgrave), who believes that the hard work and discipline imposed on his charges will ultimately make them useful members of society. Colin, sullen and rebellious, immediately catches his eye as a test of his beliefs.

The boys live in a series of Nissen huts with no privacy.

An important part of the Governor's rehabilitation programme is athletics, and he soon notices that Colin is a talented runner, easily able to outrun Ruxton's reigning long-distance runner. The Governor was once a runner himself, and he is especially keen on Colin's abilities because, for the first time, his charges have been invited to compete in a five-mile cross-country run against Ranley, a nearby public school with privileged pupils from upper-class families. The Governor sees the invitation as an important way to demonstrate the success of his rehabilitation programme.

The Governor takes Colin under his wing, offering him outdoor gardening work and eventually the freedom of practice runs outside Ruxton's barbed-wire fences. This is shown interspersed with a series of flashbacks showing how Colin came to be incarcerated, beginning with one showing his family's difficult, poverty-stricken life in a lower-class district of industrial Nottingham, where they live in a prefab. The jobless Colin indulges in petty crime in the company of his best friend, Mike (James Bolam). Meanwhile, at home, his father's long years of toil in a local factory have resulted in a terminal illness for which he refuses treatment and dies, leaving Colin as the family's jobless breadwinner.

Colin rebels by refusing a job offered to him at his father's factory. The company has paid a paltry £500 in insurance money, and he watches with disdain as his mother (Avis Bunnage) spends what Colin considers an offensive sum. Colin symbolically burns some of his portion of the insurance money and uses the rest to treat Mike and two girls they meet to an outing in Skegness, where Colin confesses to his date, Audrey (Topsy Jane) that she is the first woman he's ever had sex with.

His mother moves her lover, whom Colin resents, into the house; an argument ensues, and she tells Colin to leave until he can bring home some money. He and Mike take to the streets, and they spot an open window at the back of a bakery. There is nothing worth stealing except the cashbox, which contains about £70. Mike is all for another outing to Skegness with the girls, but Colin is more cautious and hides the money in a drainpipe outside his house. Soon the police call, accusing Colin of the robbery. He tells the surly detective (Dervis Ward) he knows nothing about it. The detective produces a search warrant on a subsequent visit, but finds nothing. Finally, frustrated and angry, he returns to say he'll be watching Colin. As the two stand at Colin's front door in the rain, the torrent of water pouring down the drainpipe dislodges the money, which washes out around Colin's feet.

This backstory is interspersed in flashbacks with Colin's present-time experiences at Ruxton Towers, where he must contend with the jealousy of his fellow inmates over the favouritism shown to him by the Governor—especially when the Governor decides not to discipline Colin, as he does the others, for rioting in the dining hall over Ruxton's poor food. Colin also witnesses the kind of treatment given to his fellows who are not so fortunate: beatings, bread-and-water diets, demeaning work in the machine shop or the kitchen.

Finally, the day of the five-mile race against Ranley arrives, and Colin quickly identifies Ranley's star runner, Gunthorpe (James Fox). The proud Governor looks on as the starting gun is fired. In the final mile Colin overtakes Gunthorpe while running through the woods and then gains a comfortable lead with a sure win, but a series of jarring images run through his mind: jumpcut flashes of his life at home and his mother's neglect; his father's dead body; stern lectures from detectives, police, the Governor and Audrey. Just yards from the finish line, he stops running and remains in place, despite the calls, howls and protests from the Ruxton Towers crowd. In close-up, Colin looks directly at the governor with a defiant smile, an expression that remains as the Ranley runner passes the finish line to victory. The Governor is clearly disappointed.

At the end, Colin is back in the Borstal's machine shop, now ignored by the Governor.

Cast

Production

Writing
Sillitoe's screenplay can be interpreted as either tragic or bathetic by ultimately projecting the protagonist as a working class rebel rather than an otherwise rehabilitated but conformist talent. During the period when Sillitoe wrote the book and screenplay the sport of running was changing. The purity of running was taken away when Smith entered the race for his own and his institution's benefit — a commodity useful for his patrons' own promotion. Sillitoe rejects the commoditisation of running in his book and screenplay, believing instead a professional becomes commercialised and loses the clarity of thought that comes with running otherwise. This is why Smith chooses to forfeit the race. Literary critic Helen Small states, “...the weight of literary attention seems to be focused on a ‘pre-professional era’  — either written at that time or looking back at it for inspiration”. Her research stresses that Sillitoe was an author who believed in the unadulterated sport.

Running is also used as a metaphor to give Smith the ability to escape from the reality of his class level in society. The use of this sport gives Smith the ability to escape from his life as a member of the working class poor. Sillitoe has used running to give his character a chance to reflect upon his social status and also to escape from the reality that the poor in Britain are faced with. Long-distance running gives the character an ability to freely escape from society without the pressures of a team, which may be found in other athletic stories.

Filming
Locations were shot in and around Ruxley Towers, Claygate, Surrey – a Victorian mock castle built by Henry Foley, 5th Baron Foley. The building had been used by the Navy, Army and Air Force Institutes during the Second World War.

Music
The original trumpet theme to the film was performed by Fred Muscroft, the Principal Cornet (at the time) of the Scots Guards.

Reception
The film holds a rating of 70% on Rotten Tomatoes from 23 reviews.

Box office
The film was a box-office disappointment.

Awards and nominations
Most Promising New Actor - BAFTA (Tom Courtenay)
Best Foreign Director (nominee) - Italian National Syndicate of Film Journalists (Tony Richardson)
Best Actor - Mar del Plata Film Festival (Tom Courtenay)
A 2018 Time Out magazine poll of 150 actors, directors, writers, producers, and critics ranked it the 36th best British film ever made.

See also
 BFI Top 100 British films

References

External links 
 
 

1960s coming-of-age drama films
1960s prison films
1960s sports drama films
British black-and-white films
British coming-of-age drama films
British prison drama films
British sports drama films
Films about dysfunctional families
Films about social class
Films based on short fiction
Films directed by Tony Richardson
Films scored by John Addison
Films set in Lincolnshire
Films set in Nottingham
Films shot in Surrey
Running films
Skegness
Social realism in film
1962 drama films
1960s English-language films
1960s British films